VX Sagittarii is an extreme asymptotic giant branch star located more than 1.5 kiloparsec away from the Sun in the constellation of Sagittarius. It is a pulsating variable star with an unusually large magnitude range. It is the most luminous known AGB star, at bolometric magnitude –8.6, which is even brighter than the theoretical limit at –8.0.

Observations

The star is classed as a cool semiregular variable of type SRc with a pulsational period of 732 days.  The variations sometimes have an amplitude comparable to a long period variable, at other times they are much smaller.  The spectral type varies between M4e around visual maximum and M9.8e at minimum light, and the luminosity class is Ia indicating a bright supergiant.  The spectrum shows emission lines indicating that the star is losing mass through a strong stellar wind.

The annual parallax of VX Sagittarii has been measured extremely accurately using VLBI and found to be , indicating a distance of about 5,100 light years.  This is compatible with the distance to Sagittarius OB1, the stellar association that VX Sagittarii is thought to belong to.  Its radial velocity and proper motions are also consistent with other members of the association.

Stellar characteristics
The effective temperature of VX Sagittarii is apparently highly variable from around 2,400 K at visual minimum to around 3,300 K near maximum. Such low temperatures are comparable to the very coolest AGB stars and unprecedented for a massive supergiant. Older studies frequently calculated higher luminosities.

The atmosphere of VX Sgr shows molecular water layers and SiO masers in the atmosphere, typical of an OH/IR star.  The masers have been used to derive an accurate distance of 1,590 parsecs.  The spectrum also indicates strong VO and CN.  In many respects the atmosphere is similar to low mass AGB stars such as Mira variables, but a supergiant luminosity and size.

More recent papers state that VX Sagittarii is a massive AGB star, rather than a red supergiant or hypergiant. Because it displays Rubidium in its spectrum and has a high mass loss and luminosity, it is possible that it is a type of AGB star known as a Super-AGB star, a type of star with masses in between low-mass stars and high-mass stars.

References

Further reading

Asymptotic-giant-branch stars
Semiregular variable stars
Emission-line stars

Sagittarius (constellation)
J18080404-2213266
BD-22 4575
165674
088838
TIC objects
Sagittarii, VX